Active Dayton is an alternative weekly newspaper based in Dayton, Ohio. The newspaper includes highlights of Dayton area arts, music, dining, and films, as well as classified advertising. The first edition of the newspaper was published in the 1990s.

Active Dayton provides a yearly "Best Of" list for the Dayton and outlying areas that includes Best Restaurants, Best Clubs, Best Theater, etc. Active Dayton also has party crashers which are a group from Active Dayton that go to clubs and events in Dayton and take pictures to post on the website and give a summary in the paper of the events.

Active Dayton is a part of Cox Enterprises, the same company that owns Dayton Daily News.

External links

 Active Dayton

Alternative weekly newspapers published in the United States
Newspapers published in Dayton, Ohio
Cox Newspapers
1990s establishments in Ohio